The Boise Hawks are an independent baseball team of the Pioneer League, which is not affiliated with Major League Baseball (MLB) but is an MLB Partner League. Home games are played at Memorial Stadium in Garden City, Idaho, a small city surrounded by Boise.

From their establishment in 1987 through 2020, the Hawks were members of the Class A Short Season Northwest League. In conjunction with a contraction of Minor League Baseball in 2021, the team shifted to the Pioneer League, which was converted from an MLB-affiliated rookie league to an independent baseball league and granted status as an MLB Partner League.

History
Prior to moving to the Boise area, the team was the Tri-Cities Triplets, who played in Richland, Washington, for four seasons after moving over from Walla Walla in 1983. An affiliate of the Texas Rangers for the first two seasons in Richland, they operated as an independent in 1985 and 1986. The Triplets were sold in the fall of 1986 to Diamond Sports and moved to Idaho for the 1987 season. Diamond Sports was headed by the Triplets' general manager Mal Fichman.

Their debut game was on the road and drew over 7,100 at Spokane, aided by the appearance of Hank Aaron. Continuing as an independent for their first three seasons in Boise, they joined the California Angels organization in 1990; the Angels were previously affiliated with the Bend Bucks for two seasons. The Hawks made the playoffs that first season under the Angels and then won the league title four times in the next five years.

After eleven seasons with the Angels, the Hawks moved their affiliation in 2001 to the Chicago Cubs, who were with the Eugene Emeralds for the two previous seasons. Under the Cubs, the Hawks won two league titles and were runners-up three times. After fourteen years with Chicago, the Hawks switched in 2015 to the Rockies, who were previously affiliated with the Tri-City Dust Devils in Pasco for fourteen seasons.
The Boise Hawks had the “Dream Team” in 2012. This team had future big leaguers: Dan Vogelbach, Willson Contreras, Albert Almora Jr., Feliz Pena, Stephen Bruno, Marco Hernández, Trey Martin, Yasiel Balancourt, and Pierce Johnson. They also had the MILB Nickname Champ: Rock Shoulders

Due to the COVID-19 pandemic, the entire 2020 season for the minor leagues was cancelled. The following winter, as part the reorganization of minor league baseball, the Northwest League was elevated to the classification of High Single-A and renamed High-A West. The league was contracted to six teams and the Hawks were not extended an invitation to continue as a franchise affiliated with a major league organization. The franchise announced they will continue as members of the independent Pioneer League, an MLB Partner League.

Prior to the cancelation of the 2020 season and subsequent minor league reorganization, the team was slated to appear as the "Boise Papas Fritas" in six 2020 home games as part of the "Copa de Diversion" program.

Ballparks
The Hawks play their home games at Memorial Stadium in Garden City, north of the Western Idaho Fairgrounds. The facility on the banks of the Boise River has a seating capacity of 3,500; it opened in 1989 for the Hawks' third season, its last without an affiliation. The stadium was privately built by an investor group led by Bill Pereira and son Cord Pereira. For their first two seasons, the Hawks played their home games at Bill Wigle Field on the campus of Borah High School.

Previous Boise teams
Prior to the Hawks, Boise hosted two Northwest League franchises in the 1970s. The Boise A's played two seasons (1975, 1976), then relocated to Canada at Medicine Hat, Alberta. In 1978, the Boise Buckskins played just one season, went bankrupt, and ceased operations. Both clubs played at Borah Field (now Bill Wigle Field).

Boise had been a longtime member of the Pioneer League, then in Class C. The teams were originally known as the Pilots, then as the Yankees (1952, 1953). The club reverted to the Pilots moniker in 1954. Upon signing a player development contract with the Milwaukee Braves, Boise became the Braves and continued the relationship until 1963. Renowned broadcaster Bob Uecker played catcher for the league champion Boise Braves in 1956 and 1958. The Pioneer League teams played at Airway Park, later known as Braves Field, about a half mile (0.8 km) east of Bronco Stadium, in Municipal Park in east Boise, now the site of the headquarters of the Idaho Department of Fish and Game.

Ownership and media
The Boise Hawks are owned by Agon Sports & Entertainment LLC, and the company president is Jeff Eisemann.

Season-by-season record

Current roster

Notable alumni

 Oreste Marrero (1989)
 Reggie Williams (1989)
 Ken Edenfield (1990)
 Hilly Hathaway (1990)
 Phil Leftwich (1990)
 Darryl Scott (1990)
 Paul Swingle (1990)
 Mark Dalesandro (1990)
 P.J. Forbes (1990)
 J.R. Phillips (1990)
 Garret Anderson (1990)
 Troy Percival (1990–1991)
 Orlando Palmeiro (1991)
 Chris Pritchett (1991)
 Mark Sweeney (1991)
 Chris Turner (1991)
 Eduardo Pérez (1991)
 Anthony Chavez (1992)
 Jeff Schmidt (1992)
 Bill Simas (1992)
 Ryan Hancock (1993)
 Jamie Burke (1993)
 Todd Greene (1993)
 Aaron Guiel (1993)
 Jason Dickson (1994)
 Mike Holtz (1994)
 Bret Hemphill (1994)
 Justin Baughman (1995)
 Trent Durrington (1995)
 Juan Alvarez (1995)
 Brian Cooper (1995)
 Jarrod Washburn (1995)
 Trent Durrington (1996)
 Ramon Ortiz (1996)
 Brandon Puffer (1996)
 Jerrod Riggan (1996)
 Greg Jones (1997)
 Doug Nickle (1997)
 Scot Shields (1997)
 Matt Wise (1997)
 Alfredo Amezaga (1999)
 Tom Gregorio (1999)
 Gary Johnson (1999)
 Robb Quinlan (1999)
 Dusty Bergman (1999)
 John Lackey (1999)
 Francisco Rodríguez (1999)
 Tommy Murphy (2000)
 Joel Peralta (2000)
 Angel Guzman (2001)
 Sergio Mitre (20001)
 Carmen Pignatiello (2001)
 Felix Sanchez (2001)
 Dontrelle Willis (2001)
 Geovany Soto (2002)
 Micah Hoffpauir (2002)
 Randy Wells (2002)
 Ryan O'Malley (2002)
 Clay Rapada (2002)
 Jae Kuk Ryu (2002)
 Andy Sisco (2002)
 Ricky Nolasco (2002)
 Robinson Chirinos (2002)
 Felix Pie (2002)
 Ronny Cedeno (2002)
 Jose Reyes (catcher) (2003)
 Sean Marshall (2003)
 Rich Hill (2003)
 Rocky Cherry (2003)
 Adalberto Mendez (2003)
 Billy Petrick (2003)
 Luis Montanez (2004)
 Mitch Atkins (2005)
 Donnie Veal (2005)
 Jose Ceda (2006)
 Billy Petrick (2006)
 Russ Canzler (2006)
 Blake Lalli (2006)
 Jeff Samardzija (2006)
 Welington Castillo (2006)
 Tyler Colvin (2006)
 Darin Downs (2006)
 Jerry Blevins (2006)
 Josh Vitters (2007)
 Alberto Cabrera (2007)
 Marcus Hatley (2007) 
 Josh Donaldson (2007)
 Brandon Guyer (2007)
 Steve Clevenger (2007)
 Blake Parker (2007)
 Al Albuquerque (2007)
 Jeff Beliveau (2008)
 Chris Carpenter (2008)
 Erik Hamren (2008)
 Marcus Hatley (2008)
 Jay Jackson (2008) 
 Marwin González (2008)
 Josh Harrison (2008)
 Andrew Cashner (2008)
 Casey Coleman (2008)
 Ryan Flaherty (2008)
 Brooks Raley (2009)
 Chris Rusin (2009)
 Logan Watkins (2009)
 Brett Jackson (2009)
 Tony Campana (2010)
 Justin Bour (2010)
 Arismendy Alcantara (2010)
 Dallas Beeler (2010)
 Eric Jokisch (2010)
 Elliot Soto (2010)
 Matt Szczur (2010)
 Javier Baez (2011)
 Rafael Lopez (2011)
 Andrew McKirahan (2011)
 Tony Zych (2011)
 Tayler Scott (2012)
 Dong-Yub Kim (2012) (KBO)
 Willson Contreras (2012)
 Marco Hernández (2012)
 Pierce Johnson (2012)
 Jeimer Candelario (2012)
 Felix Pena (2012)
 Albert Almora (2012)
 Dan Vogelbach (2012)
 Kris Bryant (2013)
 Jacob Hannemann (2013)
 Duane Underwood (2013)
 Erick Castillo (2013)
 Paul Blackburn (2013)
 Zack Godley (2013)
 Kyle Schwarber (2014)
 James Norwood (2014)
 David Bote (2014)
 Adbert Alzolay (2014)
 Mark Zagunis (2014)
 Gleyber Torres (2014)
 Dillon Maples (2014)
 Justin Lawrence (2015)
 Tyler Matzek (2015)
 Yonathan Daza (2015)
 Kevin Padlo (2015)
 David Dahl (2015)
 Tyler Nevin (2015)
 Julian Fernandez (2016)
 Rico Garcia (2016)
 Antonio Santos (2016)
 Garrett Hampson (2016)
 Sean Bouchard (2017)
 Stephen Cardullo (2017)
 Jairo Diaz (2018)
World Series champions
 Orlando Palmeiro - 2002 Angels
 Alfredo Amezaga - 2002 Angels
 Ramon Ortiz - 2022 Angels
 Matt Wise - 2002 Angels
 Dennis Cook - 2002 Angels
 Scott Shields - 2002 Angels
 Francisco Rodríguez – 2002 Angels
 Garret Anderson – 2002 Angels
 Jarrod Washburn – 2002 Angels
 John Lackey – 2002 Angels, 2013 Red Sox, 2016 Cubs
 Dontrelle Willis – 2003 Marlins
 Kris Bryant – 2016 Cubs
 Kyle Schwarber – 2016 Cubs
 Wilson Contreras – 2016 Cubs
 Albert Almora – 2016 Cubs 
 Matt Szczur – 2016 Cubs
 Felix Pena - 2016 Cubs
 Rob Zastryzny - 2016 Cubs
 Joel Peralta - 2016 Cubs
 Jeimer Candelario - 2016 Cubs
 Marwin Gonzalez - 2017 Astros
 Marco Hernández - 2018 Red Sox (injured)
 Tyler Matzek - 2021 Braves

See also

References

External links

Stats Crew Boise Hawks
1950s ballpark aerial photo

Baseball teams established in 1987
Hawks
Professional baseball teams in Idaho
Anaheim Angels minor league affiliates
California Angels minor league affiliates
Chicago Cubs minor league affiliates
Colorado Rockies minor league affiliates
1987 establishments in Idaho
Pioneer League (baseball) teams
Northwest League teams